Zhuk (Belarusian, Russian, and Ukrainian: Жук) is a gender-neutral surname derived from a Slavic word meaning beetle. Notable people with the surname include:
Aleksey Zhuk (born 1955), former Soviet/Russian handball player
Angelina Zhuk-Krasnova (born 1991), Russian pole vaulter
Dzmitry Zhuk (born 1970), Belarusian journalist and media manager
Irina Zhuk (born 1966), Soviet ice dancer
Ksenia Zhuk, Belarusian singer, member of Naviband
Nina Zhuk (born 1934), Soviet pair skater
Radyyon Zhuk (born 1983), Belarusian professional footballer
Sofya Zhuk (born 1999), Russian tennis player
Stanislav Zhuk (1935–1998), Soviet pair skater
Tatyana Zhuk (1946–2011), Soviet pair skater
Vadim Zhuk (born 1952), Belarusian retired football referee
Vadym Zhuk (born 1991), Ukrainian footballer
Vincent Zhuk-Hryshkevich (1903–1989), Belarusian politician
Volodymyr Zhuk, Ukrainian football goalkeeper
Yawhen Zhuk (born 1976), Belarusian-Israeli football player
Yevgeny Zhuk, Belarusian-Israeli professional football (soccer) player

See also
 
 Zhuk (disambiguation)

Belarusian-language surnames
Russian-language surnames
Ukrainian-language surnames